Kenan Čejvanović (born 9 August 1986) is a Bosnian-Herzegovinian retired football player, who played for HNK Segesta.

Club career
Čejvanović started his professional career at FK Sloboda Tuzla, accumulating 110 caps and 8 goals during his four seasons in the first team, establishing himself in the u21 national team and gaining 2 caps for the A national team. In July 2008 he signed a five-year contract with the Romanian club FC Politehnica Timișoara, but the deal fell through and the contract was annulled because the Romanian club couldn't find a way to pay the transfer fee before the end of the transfer period, on account of Sloboda's accounts in Bosnia being blocked, so Čejvanović returned to Tuzla, playing 5 more games for Sloboda, before being transferred in January 2009 to the Croatian club HNK Rijeka.

After a one and a half seasons in Rijeka without attaining a secure spot in the first eleven for longer periods, he was transferred to NK Karlovac, signing a 2-year deal.

International career
He made his debut for Bosnia and Herzegovina in a June 2008 friendly match against Azerbaijan in which he came on as a stoppage time substitute. It remained his sole official international appearance. He also played in an unofficial match against Poland in 2007.

References

External links

promoizlog.net
prosport.ro

1986 births
Living people
Sportspeople from Tuzla
Association football central defenders
Bosnia and Herzegovina footballers
Bosnia and Herzegovina international footballers
FK Sloboda Tuzla players
HNK Rijeka players
NK Karlovac players
HNK Gorica players
FC Ararat Yerevan players
NK Vinogradar players
HNK Segesta players
Premier League of Bosnia and Herzegovina players
Croatian Football League players
Armenian Premier League players
First Football League (Croatia) players
2. Liga Interregional players
Bosnia and Herzegovina expatriate footballers
Expatriate footballers in Croatia
Bosnia and Herzegovina expatriate sportspeople in Croatia
Expatriate footballers in Armenia
Expatriate footballers in Switzerland
Bosnia and Herzegovina expatriate sportspeople in Switzerland